"Consideration" is a song recorded by Barbadian singer Rihanna from her eighth studio album Anti (2016). It was co-written by featured artist SZA, with Rihanna and the song's producer, Tyran Donaldson. "Consideration" is a dub-inspired hip-hop and R&B song, with a "stuttering, distorted beat", "pounding percussion", "a crunchy groove", and a "throbbing bass line" in its instrumentation. Lyrically, the song is a declaration of independence, and a desire to seek peace of mind.

Rihanna performed "Consideration" with SZA on a medley with "Work" on the 2016 Brit Awards, after which she included it on her Anti World Tour. Upon the release of the album, "Consideration" charted in a few European countries, such as France and Sweden, and following the Brit Awards performance, the song debuted on the UK Singles Chart and the UK R&B Chart. On December 8, 2017, an EP including six dance remixes of the song was released on streaming music services.

Background and recording 
"Consideration" was originally meant for inclusion on SZA's debut album, Ctrl (2017), with the title "LouAnne Johnson", which was inspired by and named after Michelle Pfeiffer's character in Dangerous Minds (1995). SZA has stated that the song reminded her of the movie Dangerous Minds (1995) "mixed with the yodeling" from Insidious (2010). SZA was invited to a writing camp by Rihanna, but was ultimately unsuccessful in writing her any new music at the time, however, in an effort to impress Pharrell Williams, she performed "Consideration", which Rihanna later asked to have for her album, Anti. SZA's decision to relinquish the song ultimately "devastated" her, and caused her to think "[she'll] never make anything better". Speaking to i-D, SZA stated: "I think I needed that song on my album. But, then I do also think it was supposed to work out the way it worked out. I wonder though... Ctrl probably would have been completed a year earlier had I kept 'Consideration' [...] In some circles I think people thought it would do more for me. I didn't think it would do anything. So I guess I landed somewhere in the middle."

"Consideration" was written by Solana Rowe (who is known professionally as SZA), Tyran Donaldson, and Rihanna. It was produced by Donaldson with vocal production by Kuk Harrell. Shea Taylor was responsible for keyboards, Carter Lang played organ and synth bass, and Marcos Tovar was in charge of the vocal recording. The song was recorded at the Jungle City Studios in New York City and mixed at Larrabee Studios in Universal City. "Consideration" features vocals by SZA, who is part of Top Dawg Entertainment, an independent label, with Donaldson. She published a few lines of the track during an Instagram post on May 21, 2015.

Composition and lyrical interpretation

"Consideration" is the opening track of the album, with a length of two minutes and forty-one seconds. Jeff Benjamin of Fuse considers it "more of Anti's intro track than a proper pop song." It was written in the key of G minor with a tempo of 145 beats per minute. It is a "glitchy, dub-inspired" pop and hip-hop track, "fusing an eerie, down-tempo tune," with a "stuttering, distorted beat," "pounding percussion" "a crunchy groove," and a "throbbing bass line." During the song, she explores the contours of her Barbadian accent, "jump[ing] from powerful, low notes to head-voice notes." Rihanna's tone is "pugnacious, but playful," according to Emily MacKay of NME. Forrest Wickman of Slate stated that Kuk Harrell "lift[s] the bass line from Common's 'Be (Intro)'."

Lyrically, "Consideration" is a declaration of independence, as Rihanna is trying to prove "she is the one steering the wheel of her career," outlining "her worth as artist and business asset." The song opens with "a Peter Pan metaphor about being held back from maturing," where she sings: "I come fluttering in from Neverland [...] Why will you never let me grow?". In the chorus, she bluntly sings: "I got to do things my own way, darling," while also expressing dissatisfaction and asking "in a thick patois": "Will you ever let me? Will you ever respect me? No!". During the second verse, she "asserts that she's through with acting as the world's avatar," asking: "Darling, would you mind giving my reflection a break from the pain it's feeling now?". During the second verse Rihanna sings rebelliously, "Let me cover your shit in glitter, I can make it gold."

Nolan Feeney of Time opined that in the song "Rihanna seems determined to explain what took her so long." Bianca Gracie of Idolator went further, analyzing that it features "lyrical nods to her 2014 transition from Def Jam to Roc Nation." Chris Gerard of PopMatters stated that the lyrics deal with, "an issue that frequently arises when a young artist who is largely controlled by record label executives, managers and producers gets to the point where she can flex her own artistic muscles." Sal Cinquemani of Slant Magazine declared: "To say that the album, her first in over three years, has had a contentious road to release is an understatement, with reports of false starts and, eventually, the promotion of three singles ['FourFiveSeconds', 'Bitch Better Have My Money' and 'American Oxygen'] that, though moderately successfully, failed to resonate with fans or critics the way her past hits have. And without missing a beat, Rihanna provides a pointed, unapologetic rejoinder to the rhetorical questions posed in the song's lyrics: 'No.'"

Critical reception
Amanda Petrusich of Pitchfork described "Consideration" as, "a prickly collaboration with the R&B singer SZA", noting that "the sentiment feels deliberately placed, meant as a way to read everything that follows." Petrusich also highlighted her "grainy, mesmerizing voice [which] is paramount [on the track]." Julianne Escobedo Shepherd of Billboard defined the song as, "a plucky thesis that delivers as the album's stony layers peel back," calling it "a loping, patois pop number." Whereas, Brittany Spanos of Rolling Stone reflected: "After years as a singer largely defined by her production, it finally feels like Rihanna is in charge of her own sound, remaking pop on her own terms." Bianca Gracie of Idolator praised "the floral vocal addition from SZA," which she explains, "elevates the track to edgier heights." Emily MacKay of NME claimed the song's message is clear: "she's excelled at being a pro, but now is her time to be an Anti." Jordan Bassett of the same publication commended the song for being "such a strong start," highlighting "the pounding percussion and Rihanna's confident flow for arrest[ing] your attention. It's languid but assured, and that's before neo-soul singer SZA's otherworldly, Kate Bush-style vocals bob and weave around the beat."

Patrick Ryan of USA Today praised the song for being a "punchy, broody banger", and further described it as, "a confident, promising prelude to whatever else Anti has in store." Forrest Wickman of Slate labelled it "a swaggering statement of purpose for post–Def Jam Rihanna." Claire Lobenfeld of Fact wrote that the track "is a flag waving toward change," declaring that it "portends the subdued album that is about to come. And it's about damn time that Rihanna ditched enormous party-starters in favor of her blunted reality." Brennan Carey of Spin praised the artistry within the song, while Safy-Hallan Farah, of the same publication, noted that the song is "an appropriate introduction to an idiosyncratic album." Emily Jupp of The Independent was positive, declaring: "Picture driving in a car, slowly, with the roof down, there's a haze of perfumed smoke in the air. The song sets out her agenda for the album; doing it her own way with surprising lyrics and introducing a relaxed stoner vibe."

Sal Cinquemani of Slant Magazine noted that the "heavy, distorted '90s-style loop and guest vocal by neo-soul singer SZA, suggested that Rihanna is determined to 'grow.'" Patricia Garcia of Vogue noted that the song "gives a mainstream introduction to the incredibly talented and underrated SZA, but it also may underscore Rihanna's intention to separate herself from her pop past." Jessica McKinney of Vibe praised the pair, writing that, "the two  each other well as they exchange vocals about cutting ties," noting that the sound "stay[s] true to SZA's alt-soul background and Rih's affinity for hip-hop." McKinney also noticed that it "has a feel good nature that sets the pace for what the rest of the album will sound like." Allan Raible of ABC News opined that "while authoritative and coldly sleek, [it] sets things off on a quirky, off-kilter foot." Chris Gerard of PopMatters had mixed feelings, describing "Consideration" as "a pedestrian mid-tempo groove with no real spark."

Commercial performance
After the release of Anti, "Consideration" charted on the French Singles Chart at number sixty-three, and on the Swedish Singles Chart at number seventy-two. Following the performance at the Brit Awards, the song charted on the UK Singles Chart at number eighty-eight, and on the UK R&B Chart at number eighteen. On October 4, 2019, the song was certified Silver by the British Phonographic Industry (BPI) for sales of 200,000. Following the release of its dance remixes, "Consideration" debuted on the US Dance Club Songs chart. The song peaked at number one, becoming Rihanna's thirty-third song to do so, extending her lead as the artist with the second-most number-ones on the chart behind Madonna (50). Rihanna also became the first act to achieve eight number-ones from a single album on the Dance Club Songs chart, breaking the record previously held by Katy Perry, who scored seven number-ones from Teenage Dream between 2010–12.

Live performances
During the 2016 Brit Awards, Rihanna performed "Consideration" with SZA as an introduction to the full performance of "Work" on February 24, 2016. This live performance was Rihanna's first appearance to promote the album. "Consideration" was also included on her Anti World Tour set list (2016). Josh Duboff of Vanity Fair praised Rihanna's performances of both "Consideration" and "Needed Me", noting that they "came alive more in the live setting than they do on the album, perhaps due to Rihanna's evident passion in selling them."

Track listing
Dance Remixes
"Consideration" (MK Remix) – 3:55
"Consideration" (Dirty South Remix) – 3:38
"Consideration" (Mangal Suvaran Remix) – 3:26
"Consideration" (James Carter Remix) – 2:37
"Consideration" (Will Clarke Remix) – 3:44
"Consideration" (Stafford Brothers Remix) – 3:23

Credits and personnel
Recording
Recorded at Jungle City Studios, New York City.
Mixed at Larrabee Studios, Universal City, CA. 
Mastered at Sterling Sound, New York City.
Personnel

Songwriting – Solana Rowe, Tyran Donaldson, Robyn Fenty
Vocals - Rihanna, SZA
Production – Tyran "Scum" Donaldson
Vocal production – Kuk Harrell
Vocal recording – Marcos Tovar, Kuk Harrell

Assistant recording engineer – Brendan Morawski
Mastering – Chris Gehringer
Keyboards – Shea Taylor
Mixing – Manny Marroquin
Assistant mixing engineer – Chris Galland
Organ, synth bass – Carter Lang

Credits adapted from Rihanna's official website.

Charts

Certifications

Release history

See also
 List of number-one dance singles of 2018 (U.S.)

References

2016 songs
Hip hop songs
Rihanna songs
SZA songs
Song recordings produced by Kuk Harrell
Songs written by Rihanna
Songs written by SZA